Bouyon (pronunciation: boo-yon) is a genre of Dominican music that originated in Dominica in the late 1980s mainly with the group "WCK", with names such as Derek "Rah" Peters on vocals, Cornell Phillips keys and vocals among others, while bands such as the "Triple Kay" are very popular with "Carlyn XP" being the undisputed MCs for having won numerous contests. Dominican singers such as "Asa Banton", "Suppa", "Benz Mr Gwada", "Reo" and "Gaza Girl" became popular years later.

"Hardcore Bouyon", also called "Gwada-Bouyon," is another type of bouyon, different to the Dominican genre which began through musical collaborations between citizens of Dominica and Guadeloupe, who both speak Antillean Creole. The term Bouyon means something akin to "gumbo soup" or "coubouyon poisson" (a typical Caribbean dish) in Antillean Creole. Bouyon music is a mix of traditional and modern music, and is popular across much of the Caribbean.

Origin
The best-known band in this genre is Windward Caribbean Kulture (WCK), which started the style in 1988 by experimenting with a fusion of Jing ping and cadence-lypso.

While the cadence-lypso sound features acoustic drums, aggressive up-tempo guitar beat, and strong social commentary in the native Creole language, the music created by WCK focused more on the use of technology with a strong emphasis on keyboard rhythmic patterns.

Bouyon, popularized largely by WCK, blends jing ping, cadence-lypso and traditional dances, namely bèlè, quadrille, chanté mas and lapo kabwit, mazurka, zouk and other styles of Caribbean music.

Windward Caribbean Kulture

The band made its debut in 1988 with an album titled One More Sway, which coincided with the Reunion Year (10th anniversary) Independence celebrations. The next album, released in 1990, titled Culture shock was a defining moment for the band. The album included tracks such as "Culture Shock" and "Dance Floor".

The band toured the United States, Canada, Europe, and the Caribbean from 1995 to 1998, releasing the albums Original Hold Dem, Too Many Cooks and Marathon, which led to wider international recognition for both the band and Bouyon music.

Newer offshoots

Jump up
In 1987, Exile One recorded a Chanté mas and Lapo Kabwit song, "L'hivenage", commonly referred to as the yo. The French Antilleans referred to the beat as "jump up music" because of its carnival style sound. This jump upbeat was later modified to become bouyon or modern soca music. (As printed on Exile One's album "creole attitude").
In Guadeloupe and Martinique, "Jump up" refers generally to bouyon music.

Bouyon Soca
Bouyon soca is a fusion-genre that blends bouyon and soca music.

Bouyon-muffin
A modern offshoot of bouyon is Bouyon-muffin. It combines elements of Jamaican raggamuffin music, hip hop, and dancehall. The most influential figure in the development of bouyon-muffin is "Skinny Banton" (now known as "Shadowflow") who from 1995 collaborated with the WCK band, using ragga influenced vocals to chant on top of bouyon rhythms. Songs like "party" ft Joanne with Bucktown sounds' DJ Cut gave the products of bouyon muffin like "Bushtown clan", a further inspiration to incorporate more hip-hop and dancehall into the Bouyon-muffin genre to create "reketeng".

Reketeng
Reketeng is a style of bouyon based on sampling. It remixed existing Dancehall and Hip-Hop recordings over Bouyon instrumentals. DJ Cut and the creation of Reketeng gave rise to Dominica Dj's experimenting bouyon with other genres and created a new wave in the music of Dominica.

Like dub music, reketeng consists predominantly of instrumental remixes of existing recordings and is achieved by significantly altering the recordings, usually by removing the beat from an existing music piece and emphasizing the bouyon drum and bass parts. This stripped-down track is sometimes referred to as a 'riddim'.

Alternative bouyon
The Ncore Band produces an alternative twist to the bouyon genre they call "rhythm core" a fusion of rock, heavy metal and bouyon.
They have released a single Riddum Nation.

Bouyon gwada
Due to the popularity of Triple K International, Ncore, Asa Bantan, and the new generation of bouyon bands who toured the French Antilles, a popular offshoot of bouyon from Guadeloupe is called bouyon gwada.
The jump up had its heyday from the 90s with songs such as Met Veye WCK but remained labeled as background or carnival music. Over the years, thanks to inter-trade with the Dominicans and the mass participation of Guadeloupe at the World Creole Music Festival, groups like Triple kay and MFR band began to democratize and local artists were introduced, including the remix "Allo Triple kay" with Daly and "Big Ting Poppin" Daly alone.

A popular offshoot within the bouyon gwada is called bouyon hardcore, a style characterized by its lewd and violent lyrics. Popular bouyon gwada musicians include Wee Low, Suppa, Doc J, Yellow Gaza, and Ph-suicide and Edday.

See also
Cadence-lypso
Jing ping
Music of Dominica
Windward Caribbean Kulture
World Creole Music Festival

References

20th-century music genres
21st-century music genres
Dominica music